Manasses V, Count of Rethel (died 1272) was the youngest son of Count Hugh II and his wife, Felicitas of Broyes.

In 1262, he succeeded his brother Walter as Count of Rethel.

Manasses V was married to Elisabeth of Écry and was the father of:
 Hugh IV (1244–1285)
 Maria (1231–1315), married Walter I, Count of Enghien

Counts of Rethel
13th-century births
Year of birth unknown
1272 deaths
13th-century French people